Max Lousada is CEO of Recorded Music for Warner Music Group. He has signed and worked with a number of artists, including Ed Sheeran.

Early career
Upon leaving university, Lousada started his own distribution company called In A Silent Way, which imported and exported records for DJs and independent outlets.

He then headed-up the New York hip-hop record label Rawkus Records, working alongside the founders to develop and grow the A&R roster. During the mid to late 1990s, Rawkus became a dominant label in the underground hip-hop scene with artists such as Mos Def, Black Star and Company Flow.

From 2002 Lousada was head of A&R at Mushroom Records where he signed ambient dance act Zero 7 and played a key role in the development of their debut album Simple Things, as well as overseeing releases from bands including Muse, Garbage and Ash, and DJ Paul Oakenfold.

Atlantic Records
After Mushroom's acquisition by Warner Music, Lousada was appointed as Head of A&R at Atlantic Records UK in 2004 where he achieved success with acts such as The Darkness, James Blunt and Funeral For a Friend, before being promoted to President, and then to Chairman in 2009.

Lousada signed and worked with a number of artists including Paolo Nutini, Plan B, Ed Sheeran, Birdy, Marina and the Diamonds, Rumer, Lykke Li and Rudimental.

In 2011 Atlantic Records UK was named Label of the Year at the Music Week Awards.

Warner Music UK
Lousada was named Chairman & CEO of Warner Music UK in September 2013.

He oversaw Warner Music's UK labels - Atlantic Records, ATL, Asylum, East West, FFRR, Nonesuch, One More Tune, Parlophone, Reprise, Roadrunner, Rhino and Warner Bros. Records, as well as the UK arm of ADA and Warner Music Artist and Label Services.

WMUK has been home to a number of successful acts, including Coldplay, Ed Sheeran, Muse, Blur, Clean Bandit,  Liam Gallagher, Damon Albarn, Paolo Nutini, Jess Glynne, Biffy Clyro, Pink Floyd, Anne-Marie, Royal Blood, Charli XCX, Rita Ora, Rudimental, Dua Lipa, Lily Allen, Iron Maiden, and James Blunt as well as US and international stars Bruno Mars, Twenty One Pilots, The Black Keys, Linkin Park, Green Day, David Guetta, Michael Bublé and Jason Derulo. Warner Music’s catalogue includes music from Fleetwood Mac, Led Zeppelin, David Bowie, Prince, Kate Bush, Aretha Franklin, The Doors, Neil Young, Ray Charles, New Order, Madonna and The Smiths.

Since his appointment he has revived the East West Records label.

In May 2016, Max oversaw the development of The Firepit, Warner Music UK's creative content division, innovation centre and recording studio.

Warner Music Group 
Since October 1, 2017 Lousada has been CEO, Recorded Music for Warner Music Group (WMG) as well as Chairman & CEO of Warner Music UK.

He is responsible for all of WMG’s global Recorded Music operations, including Atlantic, Warner Bros. Records, Parlophone, Warner Music Nashville, Rhino and Warner Classics, as well as WMG's international Recorded Music affiliates and WMG’s Artist & Label Services divisions, WEA and ADA.

BRITs
In June 2014, Lousada was named as the Chairman of the BRITs Committee. Responsible for the creative direction of the show, management of the Award categories, artist line up, Voting Academy and the digital and media strategy - his first show as Chairman in February 2015 featured  Ant & Dec as hosts with performances from Madonna, Sam Smith, Ed Sheeran, Royal Blood, Paloma Faith and Kanye West, while the trophy was designed by Tracey Emin.

Lousada's second year as the BRITs Chairman saw Ant & Dec return as hosts with performances from Coldplay, Justin Bieber, James Bay, Jess Glynne, Rhianna & Drake, Little Mix, The Weeknd and Adele. The show also featured a tribute to David Bowie with an introduction by Annie Lennox, a tribute speech by Gary Oldman and a performance by Lorde with Bowie's long-time backing group. The trophy was designed by Pam Hogg.

See also
List of current Atlantic Records artists
List of former Atlantic Records artists
Atlantic Records Group
List of Atlantic Records artists
Atlantic Records discography

References

Atlantic Records
British music industry executives
Businesspeople from London
Living people
Place of birth missing (living people)
Year of birth missing (living people)